For Your Ears Only is the second studio album by Bentley Rhythm Ace, released through Parlophone in 2000. It peaked at number 48 on the UK Albums Chart.

Track listing

Charts

References

External links
 

2000 albums
Bentley Rhythm Ace albums
Parlophone albums